The I liga is the second level of league competition for Polish women's football. It is the female equivalent of the men's I liga and is run by the Polish Football Association.

2020–21 teams
The participants of the 2020-21 edition were Tarnovia Tarnów, Rekord Bielsko-Biała, Stomilanki Olsztyn, UKS SMS II Łódź, Sportowa Czwórka Radom, Pogoń Tczew, Trójka Staszkówka/Jelna, Polonia Środa Wielkopolska, Resovia, SWD Wodzisław Śląski, Praga Warsaw and Piastovia Piastów.

References

External links 
 I liga at the Polish Football Association website
 2020–21 I liga table at the 90minut.pl

Women's football leagues in Poland
Second level women's association football leagues in Europe